Big Spring Township is located in Shelby County, Illinois. As of the 2010 census, its population was 698 and it contained 326 housing units.

Geography

Adjacent townships 
 Ash Grove Township (north)
 Neoga Township, Cumberland County (northeast and east)
 Spring Point Township, Cumberland County (southeast)
 Sigel Township (south)
 Prairie Township (southwest and west)
 Richland Township (northwest)

Demographics

References

External links
City-data.com
Illinois State Archives

Townships in Shelby County, Illinois
Populated places established in 1859
Townships in Illinois
1859 establishments in Illinois